The Harrow West by-election was held on 17 March 1960 due to the suicide of the incumbent Conservative MP, Sir Albert Braithwaite.  It was won by the Conservative candidate John Page.

The Liberal Party was said to be "much encouraged" by their share of the vote according to the acting chair of the Liberal standing committee Mark Bonham Carter who also noted his party had not contested the constituency for ten years. Liberal leader Jo Grimond said that "the result strengens our claim that what the nation wants is a Liberal alternative.

The by-election took place on the same day as the Brighouse and Spenborough by-election which saw the Conservatives gain that seat from the opposition Labour Party. Morgan Phillips, Labour's General Secretary, blamed the poor results on negative press coverage arguing that "a tremendous effort" had been undertaken to develop "an unfavourable image of the party" adding that in his view "Newspaper space seems to have been allocated on political, rather than on news value."

References

Harrow West by-election
Harrow West,1960
Harrow West by-election
Harrow West by-election
Harrow West,1960
20th century in Middlesex